Eric McCormack (born 3 February 1938) is a Scottish-born Canadian author known for works blending absurdism, existentialism, crime fiction, gothic horror and the search for identity and personal meaning in works such as Inspecting the Vaults (1987), The Paradise Motel (1989), The Mysterium (1992), First Blast of the Trumpet Against the Monstrous Regiment of Women (1997) and The Dutch Wife (2002).

Biography
McCormack was born in Bellshill, Scotland, an impoverished industrial community located 32 kilometres outside Glasgow where his father worked in a steel mill.  McCormack took a master's degree in English literature from the University of Glasgow, then taught at a high school in Muirkirk, Scotland, a mining town.  In 1966, he went to the University of Manitoba in Winnipeg, Manitoba, where he wrote his PhD on Robert Burton's Anatomy of Melancholy, a text he frequently alludes to in his fiction.

In 1970 he took up a teaching post in the English Department of St. Jerome's University, which was established in 1959 as St Jerome's College and has been federated with University of Waterloo since 1960. He has since retired from teaching there.

McCormack wrote short stories in addition to his academic work, and in the 1980s published them in small literary journals such as Prism International, Malahat Review and The New Quarterly.  His first book, Inspecting the Vaults, released in 1987, is a collection of these stories.  One short story in particular, "Sad Stories in Patagonia", which describes a family tragedy, formed the basis of his next book, The Paradise Motel, which was published in 1989, and is mentioned in most of the other books that follow.

Writing
As an academic, McCormack's writings tend to be informed by the types of 17th century works that have been his academic focus, but they also encompass shadowy worlds of criminality, violence (often family violence), natural and human-invented tragedy, and magic realism.  He also favours telling the adventures of an individual by describing his or her roots (and that of his forefathers), and then traveling with him through life and its adventures.

Themes
There are several recurring themes in McCormack's books.  Besides the recurring theme of "Sad Tales of Patagonia" and its tale of murder and mutilation, McCormack's heroes tend to have an academic/bookish bent, been born in Scotland, and have settled in the same part of Canada that he did.  They also travel extensively, often by ship, and meet eccentric fellow travelers who relate to them their life stories and interests. Many of these travelers come to tragic ends themselves.

McCormack's reappearing subjects are:
 coincidence
 frequent portrayal of an ascetic life
 a sense of imminent disaster
 writing/story telling, metafiction
 intertextuality

Coincidence

Characters often meet up in unusual circumstances years after they have parted.  This is seen in short stories such as "Festival", as well as novels such as The Paradise Motel.

Failure

Generally, McCormack's heroes fail in their quests

Identity/Subjectivity

The identity of individuals is often called into questions by the events of the book.

Works

Inspecting the Vaults (1987)
Inspecting the Vaults contains an introduction and 20 short stories.  It was re-published in 1993 by Penguin in an edition that included the novel The Paradise Motel.

The Paradise Motel (1989)
The Paradise Motel is about Ezra Stevenson, who hears the tale of family murder and mutilation recounted in "Sad Stories of Patagonia" from his grandfather, Ezra Stevenson.  He makes it his life mission to find out what happened to the four survivors of the tragedy, and the book follows his quest in four sections, each named for one of the survivors.

The Mysterium (1993)
The Mysterium is a "metafictional detective" or "anti-detective" story in the vein of Umberto Eco's The Name of the Rose.

First Blast of the Trumpet Against The Monstrous Regiment of Women (1997)
First Blast of the Trumpet Against the Monstrous Regiment of Women takes its inspiration from The First Blast of the Trumpet Against the Monstrous Regiment of Women by Scottish Reformer John Knox, which was published in 1558.  The book concerns the birth, life and travels of an orphan, who encounters a bookish sailor who shows him Knox's book, among others.  It also concerns the woman that the protagonist meets in the course of his life before he finally settles in Camberloo in Canada, a fictional name for a town similar to Waterloo (Waterloo borders the town of Cambridge; "Camberloo" appears to be the amalgam of the two names).

The Dutch Wife (2002)
The Dutch Wife concerns a man whose mother married two men who bore the same name.  He embarks on a journey across the world to discover the truth behind this unusual situation.

Cloud (2014)
Cloud is McCormack's latest novel, published in August 2014.

Awards
1988 Commonwealth Writers Prize in the Canada Caribbean Region for Inspecting the Vaults
1990 Spring Book Award from the Scottish Arts Council for The Paradise Motel
1990 nominated for the People's Prize for Fiction
1997 nominated for the Governor General's Award for First Blast of the Trumpet Against the Monstrous Regiment of Women
1999 The Literacy Award at the K-W Arts Awards Ceremony

Published works

Fiction 
Inspecting the Vaults (1987) (short stories)
The Paradise Motel (1989) (fiction)
The Mysterium (1993) (fiction)
First Blast of the Trumpet Against the Monstrous Regiment of Women (1997)
The Dutch Wife (2002)
Cloud (2014)

Notes

1938 births
Living people
Canadian male novelists
University of Manitoba alumni
Alumni of the University of Glasgow
20th-century Canadian novelists
21st-century Canadian novelists
Academic staff of the University of Waterloo
Scottish emigrants to Canada
People from Bellshill
20th-century Canadian male writers
21st-century Canadian male writers